A functional differential equation is a differential equation with deviating argument. That is, a functional differential equation is an equation that contains a function and some of its derivatives evaluated at different argument values.

Functional differential equations find use in mathematical models that assume a specified behavior or phenomenon depends on the present as well as the past state of a system. In other words, past events explicitly influence future results. For this reason, functional differential equations are more applicable than ordinary differential equations (ODE), in which future behavior only implicitly depends on the past.

Definition
Unlike ordinary differential equations, which contain a function of one variable and its derivatives evaluated with the same input, functional differential equations contain a function and its derivatives evaluated with different input values.

An example of an ordinary differential equation would be 
In comparison, a functional differential equation would be 

The simplest type of functional differential equation, called the retarded functional differential equation or retarded differential difference equation, is of the form

Examples
The simplest, fundamental functional differential equation is the linear first-order delay differential equation which is given by

Below is a table with a comparison of several ordinary and functional differential equations.

Types of functional differential equations 
"Functional differential equation" is the general name for a number of more specific types of differential equations that are used in numerous applications. There are delay differential equations, integro-differential equations, and so on.

Differential difference equation 
Differential difference equations are functional differential equations in which the argument values are discrete. The general form for functional differential equations of finitely many discrete deviating arguments is 

where  and 

Differential difference equations are also referred to as retarded, neutral, advanced, and mixed functional differential equations. This classification depends on whether the rate of change of the current state of the system depends on past values, future values, or both.

Delay differential equation 

Functional differential equations of retarded type occur when  for the equation given above. In other words, this class of functional differential equations depends on the past and present values of the function with delays.

A simple example of a retarded functional differential equation is 

whereas a more general form for discrete deviating arguments can be written as

Neutral differential equations 
Functional differential equations of neutral type, or neutral differential equations occur when

Neutral differential equations depend on past and present values of the function, similarly to retarded differential equations, except it also depends on derivatives with delays. In other words, retarded differential equations do not involve the given function's derivative with delays while neutral differential equations do.

Integro-differential equation

Integro-differential equations of Volterra type are functional differential equations with continuous argument values. Integro-differential equations involve both the integrals and derivatives of some function with respect to its argument.

The continuous integro-differential equation for retarded functional differential equations, can be written as

Application
Functional differential equations have been used in models that determine future behavior of a certain phenomenon determined by the present and the past. Future behavior of phenomena, described by the solutions of ODEs, assumes that behavior is independent of the past. However, there can be many situations that depend on past behavior.

FDEs are applicable for models in multiple fields, such as medicine, mechanics, biology, and economics. FDEs have been used in research for heat-transfer, signal processing, evolution of a species, traffic flow and study of epidemics.

Population growth with time lag 
A logistic equation for population growth is given by

If we were to now apply this to an earlier time , we get

Mixing model 
Upon exposure to applications of ordinary differential equations, many come across the mixing model of some chemical solution.

Suppose there is a container holding liters of salt water. Salt water is flowing in, and out of the container at the same rate  of liters per second. In other words, the rate of water flowing in is equal to the rate of the salt water solution flowing out. Let  be the amount in liters of salt water in the container and  be the uniform concentration in grams per liter of salt water at time . Then, we have the differential equation

The problem with this equation is that it makes the assumption that every drop of water that enters the contain is instantaneously mixed into the solution. This can be eliminated by using a FDE instead of an ODE.

Let  be the average concentration at time , rather than uniform. Then, the equation is a delay-differential equation of the form

Volterra's predator-prey model
The Lotka–Volterra predator-prey model was originally developed to observe the population of sharks and fish in the Adriatic Sea; however, this model has been used in many other fields for different uses, such as describing chemical reactions. Modelling predatory-prey population has always been widely researched, and as a result, there have been many different forms of the original equation.

One example, as shown by Xu, Wu (2013), of the Lotka–Volterra model with time-delay is given below:

where  denotes the prey population density at time t,  and  denote the density of the predator population at time  and 

Note that this model uses linear partial differential equations.

Other models using FDEs
Examples of other models that have used FDEs, namely RFDEs, are given below:
Controlled motion of a rigid body
Periodic motions
Flip-flop circuit as a NDE
Model of HIV epidemic
Math models of sugar quantity in blood
Evolution equations of single species
Spread of an infection between two species
 Classical electrodynamics

See also
Volterra integral equation
Lotka–Volterra equations
Bifurcation theory
Lyapunov function
Volterra series

References

Further reading
Herdman, Terry L.; Rankin III, Samuel M.; Stech, Harlan W. (1981). Integral and Functional Differential Equations: Lecture notes. 67. United States: Marcel Dekker Inc, Pure and Applied Mathematics
Ford, Neville J.; Lumb, Patricia M. (2009). "Mixed-type functional differential equations: A numerical approach". Journal of Computational and Applied Mathematics. 229 (2): 471–479
Lemon, Greg; Kinf, John R. (2012). :A functional differential equation model for biological cell sorting due to differential adhesion". Mathematical Models and Methods in Applied Sciences. 12(1): 93–126
Da Silva, Carmen, Escalante, René (2011). "Segmented Tau approximation for forward-backward functional differential equation". Computers and Mathematics with Applications. 62 (12): 4582–4591
Pravica, D. W.; Randriampiry, N,; Spurr, M. J. (2009). "Applications of an advanced differential equation in the study of wavelets". Applied and Computational Harmonic Analysis. 27 (1): 2(10)
Breda, Dimitri; Maset, Stefano; Vermiglio Rossana (2015). Stability of Linear Delay Differential Equations: A Numerical Approach with MATLAB. Springer. 

Differential equations